Rhiannon Clarke (born 23 July 2002) is an Australian para-athletics competitor who specialises in sprint events. She won two bronze medals at the 2019 World Para Athletics Championships. She represented Australia at the 2020 Tokyo Paralympics.

Personal
Clarke was born with cerebral palsy in Joonndalup, Western Australia, on 23 July 2002. As of 2018, she attended Mater Dei College in Joondalup. The Australian Olympic Committee awarded Clarke the prestigious Pierre de Coubertin Award in 2018.

Athletics
Clarke started running after a para-come-try day in 2014. She concentrated on sprint events in 2017. As a fifteen-year-old at the 2018 Commonwealth Games, she won the silver medal in the women's 100m T38. At the 2019 World Para Athletics Championships in Dubai, she won bronze medals in the women's 100m and 200m T38.

At the 2020 Tokyo Summer Paralympics held in 2021. Clarke was a finalist in the Women's 100m T38 where she came 5th. She then came 7th in the Women's 400m T38 with a time of 1:02.65 which was an Australian record.

At the 2022 Commonwealth Games, she won the bronze medal in the women's 100m T38.

References

External links
 
 Rhiannon Clarke at Athletics Australia
 
 

2002 births
Living people
Australian female sprinters
Paralympic athletes of Australia
Cerebral Palsy category Paralympic competitors
Commonwealth Games silver medallists for Australia
Commonwealth Games bronze medallists for Australia
Commonwealth Games medallists in athletics
Athletes (track and field) at the 2018 Commonwealth Games
Athletes (track and field) at the 2022 Commonwealth Games
Athletes (track and field) at the 2020 Summer Paralympics
21st-century Australian women
Medallists at the 2018 Commonwealth Games
Medallists at the 2022 Commonwealth Games